Abu Abdullah Muhammad al-Idrisi al-Qurtubi al-Hasani as-Sabti, or simply al-Idrisi  (1100 – 1165), was a Muslim Arab geographer, Egyptologist, and cartographer who served in the court of King Roger II at Palermo, Sicily. Muhammed al-Idrisi was born in Ceuta then belonging to the Almoravids. He created the Tabula Rogeriana, one of the most advanced medieval world maps.

Early life
Al-Idrisi was born into the Hammudid family of North Africa and Al-Andalus.

Al-Idrisi was born in the city of Ceuta, at the time controlled by the Almoravids but now a part of Spain, where his great-grandfather had been forced to settle after the fall of Hammudid Málaga to the Zirids of Granada. He spent much of his early life travelling through North Africa and Al-Andalus (Muslim Spain of the times) and seems to have acquired detailed information on both regions. He visited Anatolia when he was barely 16. He studied in Córdoba.

His travels took him to many parts of Europe including Portugal, the Pyrenees, the French Atlantic coast, Hungary, and Jórvík (now known as York).

Tabula Rogeriana

Because of conflict and instability in Al-Andalus al-Idrisi joined contemporaries such as Abu al-Salt in Sicily, where the Normans had overthrown Arabs formerly loyal to the Fatimids.

Al-Idrisi incorporated the knowledge of Africa, the Indian Ocean and the Far East gathered by Islamic merchants and explorers and recorded on Islamic maps with the information brought by the Norman voyagers to create the most accurate map of the world in pre-modern times, which served as a concrete illustration of his Kitab nuzhat al-mushtaq, (Latin: Opus Geographicum), which may be translated A Diversion for the Man Longing to Travel to Far-Off Places.

The Tabula Rogeriana was drawn by al-Idrisi in 1154 for the Norman King Roger II of Sicily, after a stay of eighteen years at his court, where he worked on the commentaries and illustrations of the map. The map, with legends written in Arabic, while showing the Eurasian continent in its entirety, only shows the northern part of the African continent and lacks details of the Horn of Africa and Southeast Asia.

For Roger it was inscribed on a massive disc of solid silver, two metres in diameter.

On the geographical work of al-Idrisi, S.P. Scott wrote in 1904:

Al-Idrisi's work influenced a number of Islamic scholars including Ibn Sa'id al-Maghribi, Hafiz-i Abru, and Ibn Khaldun but his work was unknown in Western Europe and had little influence on the development of Renaissance cartography.

Description of islands in the North Sea
Al-Idrisi in his famous Tabula Rogeriana mentioned Irlandah-al-Kabirah (Great Ireland). According to him, "from the extremity of Iceland to that of Great Ireland," the sailing time was "one day." Although historians note that both al-Idrisi and the Norse tend to understate distances, the only location this reference is thought to have possibly pointed to, must likely have been in Greenland.

Description of Chinese trade
Al-Idrisi mentioned that Chinese junks carried leather, swords, iron and silk. He mentions the glassware of the city of Hangzhou and labels Quanzhou's silk as the best.
In his records of Chinese trade, al-Idrisi also wrote about the Silla Dynasty (one of Korea's historical Dynasties, and a major trade partner to China at the time), and was one of the first Arabs to do so.

Egyptology
Al-Idrisi wrote a six-chapter volume concerning the pyramids of Giza, while only mentioning the Sphinx in passing. This work took five years and gave a systematic and concise approach to the research surrounding the Giza plateau. He also mourned the destruction of other smaller pyramids in Giza, when their stones were taken to construct walls and bridges around Cairo.

Nuzhat al-Mushtaq

As well as the maps, al-Idrisi produced a compendium of geographical information with the title Kitab nuzhat al-mushtaq fi'khtiraq al-'afaq. The title has been translated as The book of pleasant journeys into faraway lands or The pleasure of him who longs to cross the horizons. It has been preserved in nine manuscripts, seven of which contain maps.

The translated title of this work (in the "pleasure of him ..." form) attracted favourable comment from the team selecting lists of names for features expected to be discovered by the New Horizons probe reconnoitring the Pluto system. The Al-Idrisi Montes is a geographical feature in that system named after him.

In the introduction, al-Idrisi mentions two sources for geographical coordinates: Claudius Ptolemy and "an astronomer" that must be Ishaq ibn al-Hasan al-Zayyat; and states that he has cross-checked oral reports from different informers to see if geographical coordinates were consistent.

Publication and translation

An abridged version of the Arabic text was published in Rome in 1592 with title: De geographia universali or Kitāb Nuzhat al-mushtāq fī dhikr al-amṣār wa-al-aqṭār wa-al-buldān wa-al-juzur wa-al-madā’ in wa-al-āfāq which in English would be Recreation of the desirer in the account of cities, regions, countries, islands, towns, and distant lands. This was one of the first Arabic books ever printed. The first translation from the original Arabic was into Latin. The Maronites Gabriel Sionita and Joannes Hesronita translated an abridged version of the text which was published in Paris in 1619 with the title of Geographia nubiensis. Not until the middle of the 19th century was a complete translation of the Arabic text published. This was a translation into French by Pierre Amédée Jaubert. More recently sections of the text have been translated for particular regions. Beginning in 1970 a critical edition of the complete Arabic text was published.

Andalusian-American contact

Al-Idrisi's geographical text, Nuzhat al-Mushtaq, is often cited by proponents of pre-Columbian Andalusian-Americas contact theories. In this text, al-Idrisi wrote the following on the Atlantic Ocean:

This translation by Professor Muhammad Hamidullah is however questionable, since it reports, after having reached an area of "sticky and stinking waters", the Mugharrarin (also translated as "the adventurers") moved back and first reached an uninhabited island where they found "a huge quantity of sheep the meat of which was bitter and uneatable" and, then, "continued southward" and reached the above reported island where they were soon surrounded by barques and brought to "a village whose inhabitants were often fair-haired with long and flaxen hair and the women of a rare beauty". Among the villagers, one spoke Arabic and asked them where they came from. Then the king of the village ordered them to bring them back to the continent where they were surprised to be welcomed by Berbers.

Apart from the marvellous and fanciful reports of this history, the most probable interpretation is that the Mugharrarin reached the Sargasso Sea, a part of the ocean covered by seaweed, which is very close to Bermuda yet one thousand miles away from the American mainland. Then while coming back, they may have landed either on the Azores, or on Madeira or even on the westernmost Canary Island, El Hierro (because of the sheep). Last, the story with the inhabited island might have occurred either on Tenerife or on Gran Canaria, where the Mugharrarin presumably met members of the Guanche tribe. This would explain why some of them could speak Arabic (some sporadic contacts had been maintained between the Canary Islands and Morocco) and why they were quickly deported to Morocco where they were welcomed by Berbers. Yet, the story reported by Idrisi is an indisputable account of a certain knowledge of the Atlantic Ocean by Andalusians and Moroccans.

Furthermore, al-Idrisi writes an account of eight Mugharrarin all from the same family who set sail from Lisbon (Lashbuna) in the first half of that century and navigated in the seaweed rich seas beyond the Azores.

Idrisi describes an island of cormorants with which has been tentatively identified as Corvo, Cape Verde but on weak grounds.

Medical dictionary
Among the lesser known works of al-Idrisi is a medical dictionary that he compiled in which he brings down a list of simple drugs and plants and their curative effects, used by physicians, apothecaries and merchants in his day. The list is unique, as it includes the names of drugs in as many as 12 languages (among which are Spanish, Berber, Latin, Greek and Sanskrit), including some sixty Hebrew terms transliterated into Arabic and which are thought to have been passed down to him by Andalusian Jewish informants. At the end of the section on medicinal herbs which are described under each letter of the alphabet, he gives an index of their entries. One of the books of herbal medicine frequently cited by al-Idrisi is Marwan ibn Ganah's Kitāb al-Talḫīṣ, who in turn had been influenced by the Andalusian Arab physician Ibn Juljul.

In popular culture
 Al-Idrisi was the main character in Tariq Ali's book entitled A Sultan in Palermo.
 Al-Idrisi is a major character in Karol Szymanowski's 1926 opera King Roger.
 Al-Idrisi's ideas on Mare Tenebrarum (Sea of Darkness) are alluded to in Pascal Mercier's book entitled Night Train to Lisbon.
 The popular IDRISI GIS system, developed by Clark University, is named after Muhammad al-Idrisi
 Al-Idrisi is a supporting character in Zeyn Joukhadar's novel The Map of Salt and Stars 
In 2019, Factum Foundation for Digital Technology in Conservation created an interpretation of Al-Idrisi's world map, a silver disk 2m in diameter based on the maps contained in the Bodleian Library's copy of the Nuzhat al-Mushtaq.

Gallery

See also

Al-Bakri
Ibn Jubayr
Abu al-Salt
History of cartography
Islamic geography
List of Arab scientists

Notes

References

Bibliography

.
.
.
. A critical edition of the Arabic text.
 Al-Idrîsî (1995), Kitâb al-Jâmi' li- sifât ashtât al-nabât wa-durûb anwâ' al-mufradât / Compendium of the Properties of Diverse Plants and Various Kinds of Simple Drugs, vols. I-III, Fuat Sezgin (ed). 
 

Ferrer-Gallardo, X. and Kramsch, O. T. (2016), Revisiting Al-Idrissi: The EU and the (Euro)Mediterranean Archipelago Frontier. Tijdschrift voor economische en sociale geografie, 107: 162–176. doi:10.1111/tesg.12177 http://onlinelibrary.wiley.com/doi/10.1111/tesg.12177/abstract

. Volume 1: Gallica / Internet Archive; Volume 2: Gallica / Internet Archive. Complete translation of Nuzhat al-mushtāq fī ikhtirāq al-āfāq into French.
. First published in 1981. Section on the Maghrib and Sudan from Nuzhat al-mushtaq fi ikhtiraq al-afaq.
.
177

Further reading

.
.
.

External links
.
 Britannica
 Online exhibition, Bibliothèque nationale de France (French)
 Idrisi's world map, Library of Congress.  Konrad Miller's 1927 consolidation and transliteration, with high-resolution zoom browser.
Online Galleries, History of Science Collections, University of Oklahoma Libraries High resolution images of works by al-Idrisi in .jpg and .tiff format.
 IDRISI GIS home page
 "Travels into the Inland Parts of Africa: Containing a Description of the Several Nations for the Space of Six Hundred Miles up the River Gambia" features English translations of work by al-Idrisi. The manuscript dates from 1738.
 Original Nuzhatul Mushtaq text

Geographers of the medieval Islamic world
People from Ceuta
Hammudid dynasty
1100 births
1160s deaths
Holy Land travellers
Travel writers of the medieval Islamic world
Kingdom of Sicily people
Writers under the Almoravid dynasty
12th-century Arabs
12th-century travelers
12th-century geographers